Ammani is a 2016 Indian Tamil-language drama film written and directed by Lakshmy Ramakrishnan. It features herself, Subbalakshmi and Nithin Sathya in the leading roles. The film, produced by Ven Govinda, released on 14 October 2016.

Cast 

 Lakshmy Ramakrishnan as Salamma
 Subbalakshmi as Ammani
 George Maryan as Muthu 
 Nithin Sathya as Shiva 
 Sri Mahesh as Selvam
 Regin Rose as Saravanan
 Semmalar Annam as Amutha
 Renuka C as Vennila
 Thangam Paramanandhan as Perumal
 Robo Shankar as Yaman
 Stephenraj as Admin. Officer
 Arun as Kishore
 Satyamurthy K as DMS
 Manas as Sultan
 Ramakrishnan Gopalakrishnan as lawyer
 Sangili Murugan as patient

Production 
Lakshmy Ramakrishnan was motivated to make the film after meeting an elderly ragpicker during her talk show and created a fictional story from her interaction with the woman. Veteran actress Subbalakshmi, who worked with Ramakrishnan in Gautham Vasudev Menon's Vinnaithaandi Varuvaayaa (2010), was cast in the titular role, while Ramakrishnan revealed she would also play a parallel lead role. Other actors including Robo Shankar and Nithin Sathya also later joined the cast. The film was shot throughout early 2015 in Chennai.

Post-production work began in July 2015 and the team began promotions during September 2015, with teaser trailers of the film released publicly. A "curtain-raiser" event for the film was held in Kuwait, followed by the launch of another teaser in Dubai during the same month. A release date of Diwali 2015 was initially announced, but was subsequently evaded following a dispute between Ramakrishnan and producer Ven Govinda. After a further year of stalemate, the team later prepared the film for a release in October 2016.

Soundtrack

The soundtrack to Ammani was composed by K, who reunited with Lakshmy Ramakrishnan following their collaboration in her directorial debut, Aarohanam (2012). The soundtrack album, featuring four tracks, was released on 7 October 2016. Sify.com reviewed the album, noting "On the whole, the soundtrack of Ammani impresses owing to the innovative blend of tracks that it has", adding that "although one would have hoped to have more tracks in the soundtrack, these three tracks could sit well with the movie". The Times of India called the album, "a short but decent effort by K".

Critical reception
The film opened in October 2016 to very positive reviews from critics. Sify.com wrote Ramakrishnan "has conveyed a relevant message to the society" and "as a director, she has woven all those feel good factors within the commercial format of film making". The reviewer added that "she charms us with her impeccable performance playing the lead role" and "to be precise, Lakshmy has hit the bull’s eye with Ammani!". Baradwaj Rangan of the Hindu wrote "Like all of Lakshmy Ramakrishnan’s films (this is her third), Ammani leaves you with a sense of what it could have been with a bigger budget. But the director doesn’t let this stint her ambition. "

References

External links

2016 films
2010s Tamil-language films
Indian drama films
Films scored by K (composer)
Films directed by Lakshmy Ramakrishnan
2016 drama films